Ableptina is a genus of moths of the family Noctuidae. The genus was erected by Alice Ellen Prout in 1927.

Species
Ableptina delospila A. E. Prout, 1927
Ableptina nephelopera (Hampson, 1909)
Ableptina nubifera (Hampson, 1902)

References

External links
Title page of article with original description: "A List of Noctuidae With Descriptions of New Forms Collected in the Island of São Thomé by T. A. Barns".

Herminiinae
Noctuoidea genera